Taking Off may refer to:

Music

Albums
 Taking Off (Neil Innes album), 1977
 Taking Off (David Sanborn album), 1975
 Taking Off (soundtrack), the soundtrack album to the film
 Taking Off!, a 2013 album by The Wiggles
 Takin' Off, album by Herbie Hancock

Other music
 "Taking Off" (song), a 2004 song by The Cure
 "Taking Off", a song by One Ok Rock from the album Ambitions

Other uses
 Takeoff, a phase of flight in which an aircraft transitions from ground to air
 Taking Off (film), a 1971 film comedy

See also
Take off (disambiguation)